Pocobletus is a genus of sheet weavers that was first described by Eugène Louis Simon in 1894.

Species
 it contains thirteen species:
Pocobletus bivittatus Simon, 1898 – St. Vincent
Pocobletus conspicuus (Millidge, 1991) – Peru, Brazil
Pocobletus coroniger Simon, 1894 (type) – USA, Mexico, Nicaragua, Costa Rica, Panama, Venezuela
Pocobletus eberhardi (Rodrigues, Lemos & Brescovit, 2013) – Brazil
Pocobletus girotii (Lemos & Brescovit, 2013) – Brazil
Pocobletus medonho (Lemos & Brescovit, 2013) – Brazil
Pocobletus nogueirai (Lemos & Brescovit, 2013) – Brazil
Pocobletus pallidus (Millidge, 1991) – Venezuela
Pocobletus phoenix (Lemos & Brescovit, 2013) – Brazil
Pocobletus proba (Millidge, 1991) – Bolivia
Pocobletus ribeiroi (Lemos & Brescovit, 2013) – Brazil
Pocobletus una (Lemos & Brescovit, 2013) – Brazil
Pocobletus versicolor (Millidge, 1991) – Colombia, Ecuador

See also
 List of Linyphiidae species (I–P)

References

Araneomorphae genera
Linyphiidae
Spiders of Central America
Spiders of Oceania
Spiders of South America